Rajiv Gandhi National Aviation University (RGNAU) is an autonomous central university at Fursatganj Airfield in Uttar Pradesh, India, for aviation studies and research. It is under the administration of the Ministry of Civil Aviation of the Government of India, constituted by an Act of Parliament in 2013 and physically established in 2018. It is India's first aviation university.

History
On 11 July 2013, the Union Cabinet approved the creation of India's first aviation university on 26.35 acres of land available at the Indira Gandhi Rashtriya Uran Akademi in Uttar Pradesh, with a project outlay envisaged at ₹202 crore until 2019. On 6 September 2013, the Rajiv Gandhi National Aviation University Bill, 2013 was passed by the Lok Sabha. The bill's object and reason states that the need for the university was felt due to the "marked absence of credible institutions imparting specialised technical and managerial training in air transportation, safety, security and regulatory areas,". The university was planned to expand to 250 acres in the coming phases.

The bill received the assent of the President of India in September 2013. Rajiv Gandhi National Aviation University (RGNAU) was set up as an autonomous central university under the administrative control of the Ministry of Civil Aviation of the Government of India. RGNAU signed an MoU with GMR Aviation Academy for Joint PG Diploma in Aviation/Airport Operations. The courses were planned to begin from 2018. Air Vice Marshal (retired) Nalin Tandon has been appointed as the Vice Chancellor. The government sanctioned ₹145 crore for the main work and ₹37 crore for interior furnishing of the university.

Role
It was setup with an aim to "facilitate and promote aviation studies, training, research and extension work with focus on emerging areas of studies such as aviation management, aviation regulation and policy, aviation history, aviation science and engineering, aviation law, aviation safety and security, aviation medicine, search and rescue, transportation of dangerous goods, environmental studies and other related fields".

Administration
According to the Act, the University shall have a visitor whose directions are binding and the visitor shall also appoint a Chancellor and a Vice Chancellor. Chancellor will be the head of the University. It also gives powers to establish the Court of the University, the Executive Council, the Academic Council, the Board of Affiliation and Recognition, the Boards of Schools, the Finance Committee and other authorities, and also the constitution of a Tribunal of Arbitration for dispute resolution related to contracts between the University and its employees. The annual accounts and balance-sheet of the University shall be audited by the Comptroller and Auditor General of India and shall be laid before Parliament of India.

The principal committees of the university are Executive Council and Academic Council, drawing experts and senior Government officials from the Government, IITs, IIMs, IATA, AAI etc. The university administration is managed by Vice Chancellor and Registrar, both the posts are appointed by the President of India.

Courses

RGNAU launched its first course as PG Diploma in Airport Operations in August 2019.

 Bachelor of Management Studies (BMS) in Aviation and Air Cargo
 Post-Graduate Diploma in Airport Operations (PGDAO)
 Basic Fire Fighters Course - Certificate course conducted in collaboration with GMR Aviation Academy

The admissions are based on an objective-based entrance examination.

See also
 List of pilot training institutes in India

References

External links
 

Central universities in Uttar Pradesh
Universities and colleges in Amethi district
Aviation schools in India
Memorials to Rajiv Gandhi
2013 establishments in Uttar Pradesh
Educational institutions established in 2013